The USPSA Handgun Championships are yearly championships held by the United States Practical Shooting Association (USPSA) run under USPSA-rules (contrary to the IPSC US Handgun Championship). Sometimes, all of the pistol nationals are held at the same time, other years, they have been broken up between different ranges. In order to attend one of the pistol nationals, a competitor usually has to win a "slot", usually by placing well enough at various regional and Area Championship matches held throughout the year.

Champions 
The following is a list of current and previous champions.

Overall category

Lady category

See also
USPSA Multigun Championship
IPSC US Handgun Championship
IPSC Handgun World Shoots

References

1993 USPSA Handgun Nationals, page 26 of 100
1993 USPSA Handgun Nationals, Limited, page 25 of 90
1994 USPSA Handgun Nationals, Limited, page 18 of 92
1994 USPSA Handgun Nationals, Open, page 23 of 88
1995 USPSA Handgun Nationals, Open, page 25 of 92
1995 USPSA Handgun Nationals, Limited, page 54 of 92
1996 USPSA Handgun Nationals, Limited, page 27 of 92
1996 USPSA Handgun Nationals, Open, page 30 of 96
Match Results - 2003 USPSA Handgun Nationals, Limited
Match Results - 2003 USPSA Handgun Nationals, Open
Match Results - 2004 USPSA Handgun Nationals
Match Results - 2005 USPSA Handgun Nationals, Limited, Production and Revolver
Match Results - 2005 USPSA Handgun Nationals, Open
Match Results - 2006 USPSA Handgun Nationals, Limited
Match Results - 2006 USPSA Handgun Nationals, Open and Production
Match Results - 2021 Race Gun Nationals, Open and Limited
Match Results - 2021 PCC & Carry Optics Nationals, Carry Optics and PCC
Match Results - 2021 LOCAP Nationals, Production, Limited-10, Revolver and Single Stack

Handgun shooting sports